Kayea ferruginea is a plant belonging to Calophyllaceae family; It was renamed as Mesua ferruginea and references from 1980s refer to K. ferruginea as Mesua ferruginea.

It is a small riverine species of Southeast Asia.

The distribution of this species has been recorded (Ridley, 1922) in Eastern Johore, Sungei Endau southwards, Pahang, Ayer Etam, Kelantan, Temangan and far ranging Andamans.

The fruits are 6 cm across, enveloped in four loose leathery fleshy sepals. Flowers found in short, axillary panicles and leaves are elliptic of 8 x 3 to 12 x 4.5 cm size.

The local or common name has been referred to as Sembawang tree in a paper (Ridley and Curtis, 1897). Thus, giving the area of Sembawang its name.

References

1. Ridley, H. N. (1922) Kayea ferruginea Pierre in Flora (1) and Tree flora of Malaya Vol. 2 (1973) For department of Ministry of primary industries, Malaysia page no.230

2. Ridley, H. N. and Curtis, C., (1897) Article in the Journal of the Malayan Branch of the Royal Asiatic Society No. 30

ferriginea